Anne d'Orléans (1464 – 1491 in Poitiers) was a French abbess. She was the youngest child of Charles, Duke of Orléans, and Maria of Cleves. Her only brother became King Louis XII of France in 1498.

Life
Anne became abbess of Fontevraud in 1477. This was an abbey in which both monks and nuns lived, but which was always ruled by an abbess. She continued the work of her predecessor Marie de Bretagne in reforming the order.

She also became abbess of Holy Cross Abbey in Poitiers until her death in 1491. The election that followed her death resulted in a violent contest between the brothers of two candidates for abbess.

Bibliography
Jennifer C. Edwards, “My Sister for Abbess: Fifteenth-Century Power Disputes over the Abbey of Sainte-Croix, Poitiers,” Journal of Medieval History 40, no. 1 (2014): 85–107.

Abbesses of Fontevraud
House of Valois-Orléans
15th-century French people
1464 births
1491 deaths

References